Bruno Nettl (14 March 1930 – 15 January 2020) was an ethnomusicologist who was central in defining ethnomusicology as a discipline. His research focused on folk and traditional music, specifically Native American music the music of Iran and numerous topics surrounding ethnomusicology as a discipline.

Life and career
Bruno Nettl was born in Prague, Czechoslovakia in 1930, and he was the son of Paul and Gertrude (Hutter) Nettl, who both had musical backgrounds. In 1939, Nettl and his family, which was of Jewish heritage, moved to the US to escape the Holocaust, which caused several deaths within his family. He studied at Indiana University with George Herzog and the University of Michigan and taught from 1964 at the University of Illinois, where he eventually was named Professor Emeritus of Music and Anthropology. Nettl met his wife, Wanda Maria White, while he was a student at Indiana University and the couple married in 1952. Bruno and Wanda had two children, Rebecca and Gloria. The Nettl’s were a connected family, as his daughters continued living in Champaign even in their adult lives, and Bruno was said to be a devoted father and husband who cherished every moment with his family. He continued to teach part-time until his death. Nettl introduced and expanded the ethnomusicology department at the University of Illinois, making it among the national leaders in ethnomusicology. Nettl was known to have pride in the accomplishments of his students, many of whom went on to teach at leading national universities. Active principally in the field of ethnomusicology, he did field research with Native American peoples (1960s and 1980s, see Blackfoot music), in Iran (1966, 1968–69, 1972, 1974), and in South India (1981–82). He served as president of the Society for Ethnomusicology and as editor of its journal, Ethnomusicology. Nettl held honorary doctorates from the University of Illinois, Carleton College, Kenyon College, and the University of Chicago. He was a recipient of the Fumio Koizumi Prize for ethnomusicology, and was a fellow of the American Academy of Arts and Sciences. Nettl was named the 2014 Charles Homer Haskins Prize Lecturer by the American Council of Learned Societies. In the course of his long career as a scholar and as a professor, he was the teacher of many of the most visible ethnomusicologists active today in the international scene, including Philip Bohlman, Christopher Waterman, Marcello Sorce Keller, and Victoria Lindsay Levine. The Sousa Archives and Center for American Music holds the Bruno Nettl Papers, 1966–1988, which consists of administrative and personal correspondence while Nettl was a professor and head of the Musicology Division for the University of Illinois School of Music.

The Study of Ethnomusicology
The Study of Ethnomusicology, initially published in 1983, provides comprehensive discourse of ethnomusicology and is widely considered some of Nettl’s best work. The book’s first edition included 29 chapters discussing the ins and outs of ethnomusicology, which Nettl expanded to 31 chapters in 2005, and 33 chapters in 2015. The work includes an array of riveting discussions surrounding ethnomusicology, including defining the practice, the topic of universals, fieldwork, and the effects of music on different cultures and demographics.

Nettl discusses fieldwork throughout his book, as seen in Chapter 10, “Come Back and See Me Next Tuesday: Essentials of Fieldwork,” and Chapter 11, “You Will Never Understand This Music: Insiders and Outsiders.” Chapter 10 provides an insight into Nettl’s fieldwork, as the chapter opens by detailing Nettl’s interactions with a Native American called Joe. Nettl had to do a series of favors for Joe before earning the right to interview him, demonstrating the importance of earning one’s trust while conducting fieldwork. Next, Nettl used this anecdote as a base to dive deeper into fieldwork, stating how every ethnomusicologist has a unique approach to fieldwork, fieldwork can be a private matter for some ethnomusicologists, and understanding cultural dynamics and building relationships plays a tremendous role in the success of one’s fieldwork. He also explained how three kinds of data should be gathered in fieldwork: texts, structures, and “the imponderabilia of everyday life." This chapter also extensively investigated the history of fieldwork in ethnomusicology. In this section, Nettl showed how fieldwork and research have become more unified, how ethnomusicologists became more willing to immerse themselves into a field, and how the increased accessibility of travel evolved fieldwork. The chapter concluded by detailing the best ways to identify an informant within the field and how to best extract information from him or her.

Meanwhile, Chapter 11 concentrates on a somewhat controversial ethnomusicological topic: insiders and outsiders. The chapter begins by explaining how natives to a culture tend not to appreciate foreign, especially Western, ethnomusicologists entering their domain and making claims about their music and cultures. Nettl also elaborated on how some ethnomusicologists struggle to ingratiate themselves into a field and how some view music systems as “untranslatable.” Nettl then articulated three common problems with outsider ethnomusicologists:

•	They are only focused on comparing foreign traditions to their own.

•	They want to use their own approaches to non-Western music.

•	They generalize categories of music too easily.

The chapter then transitioned to examining insiders. Nettl stated that colonialism could lead to confusion when determining who an insider is and debated whether insiders should help ethnomusicologists without compensation. The chapter concluded by outlining the best way to conduct fieldwork. Fieldwork is most effective when insiders and outsiders have mutual respect and understanding. It is also essential for outsiders to enter a field with an open mind and engage in their research as a “participant.”

Selected publications
Nettl was an extremely prolific scholar who authored numerous articles and book chapters found in an array of scholarly journals and edited volumes. Below is the list of books for which he is credited as author or editor.

 (1956). Music in Primitive Culture. Harvard University Press. .
 (1960). Cheremis Musical Styles. Indiana University Press
 (1964). Theory and Method in Ethnomusicology. The Free Press of Glencoe.
 (1965/1989). Folk and Traditional Music of the Western Continents. Prentice-Hall, Inc. .
 (1976). Folk Music In The U.S. An Introduction. WAYNE STATE UNIVERSITY PRESS. 
 (1977). Daramad of Chahargah: a study in the performance practice of Persian music. Detroit : Information Coordinators.
 (1978). Eight Urban Musical Cultures. UNIVERSITY OF ILLINOIS PRESS. 
 (1989). Blackfoot Musical Thought: Comparative Perspectives. Ohio: The Kent State University Press. .
 (1983/2005). The Study of Ethnomusicology. University of Illinois Press. .
 (1991). Comparative Musicology And Anthropology Of Music. (with Philip V. Bohlman) University of Chicago Press.
 (1995). Heartland Excursions. University of Illinois Press. 
 (1995). Music, Culture, & Experience. UNIVERSITY OF CHICAGO PRESS. 
 (1996). Excursions In World Music. PRENTICE HALL 
 (1996). Musica Folklorica Y Tradicional En Los Continentes ALIANZA 
 (1997). Africa in GARLAND PUBLISHING 
 (1998). South America, Mexico, Central America And The Car
 (1998). In The Course Of Performance. UNIVERSITY OF CHICAGO PRESS 
 (1999). Europe in GARLAND ENCYCLOPEDIA OF WORLD MUSIC, V. 8 
 (2005). Study Of Ethnomusicology UNIVERSITY OF ILLINOIS PRESS 
 (2010). Nettl's Elephant UNIVERSITY OF ILLINOIS PRESS
 (2013). Becoming an Ethnomusicologist: A Miscellany of Influences. The Scarecrow Press. .

References

Sources
  
 

1930 births
2020 deaths
Czechoslovak emigrants to the United States
Indiana University alumni
University of Michigan alumni
University of Illinois faculty
American ethnomusicologists
Czech ethnomusicologists
People from Prague